Sororopán-tepui is a  long ridge in Bolívar state, Venezuela. The ridge has a southwest–northeast orientation and is characterised by a steep southern face. Part of the Ptari Massif, it lies just south of Carrao-tepui and neighbouring Ptari-tepui.

See also
 Distribution of Heliamphora

References

Further reading

 Morton, C.V. (1957). Pteridophyta: Ptari-tepuí. [pp. 729–741] In: J.A. Steyermark et al. Botanical exploration in Venezuela -- 4. Fieldiana: Botany 28(4): 679–1225.
 Vegas-Vilarrúbia, T., S. Nogué & V. Rull (August 2012). Global warming, habitat shifts and potential refugia for biodiversity conservation in the neotropical Guayana Highlands. Biological Conservation 152: 159–168. 

Ridges
Tepuis of Venezuela
Landforms of Venezuela
Landforms of Bolívar (state)